The Senior men's race at the 2002 IAAF World Cross Country Championships was held at the Leopardstown Racecourse near Dublin, Ireland, on March 24, 2002.  Reports of the event were given in The New York Times, in the Herald, and for the IAAF.

Complete results for individuals, for teams, medallists, and the results of British athletes who took part were published.

Race results

Senior men's race (11.998 km)

Individual

†: Hamid El Mouaziz from  finished 44th in 36:57 min, but was disqualified.

Teams

Note: Athletes in parentheses did not score for the team result (n/s: nonscorer)

Participation
According to an unofficial count, 141 athletes from 37 countries participated in the Senior men's race.

 (6)
 (4)
 (5)
 (6)
 (3)
 (6)
 (5)
 (1)
 (5)
 (6)
 (6)
 (6)
 (6)
 (6)
 (2)
 (6)
 (1)
 (1)
 (2)
 (6)
 (1)
 (5)
 (4)
 (1)
 (1)
 (6)
 (3)
 (1)
 (1)
 (5)
 (3)
 (6)
 (6)
 (4)
 (1)
 (2)
 (2)

See also
 2002 IAAF World Cross Country Championships – Men's short race
 2002 IAAF World Cross Country Championships – Junior men's race
 2002 IAAF World Cross Country Championships – Senior women's race
 2002 IAAF World Cross Country Championships – Women's short race
 2002 IAAF World Cross Country Championships – Junior women's race

References

Senior men's race at the World Athletics Cross Country Championships
IAAF World Cross Country Championships